

The Director General of the Security Service is the head of the Security Service (commonly known as MI5), the United Kingdom's internal counter-intelligence and security agency.  The Director General is assisted by a Deputy Director General and an Assistant Director General, and reports to the Home Secretary, although the Security Service is not formally part of the Home Office.

List of directors general
Directors General have been:
Maj Gen Sir Vernon Kell, 1909–1940
Brigadier 'Jasper' Harker, Acting, June 1940 – April 1941
Sir David Petrie, 1941–1946
Sir Percy Sillitoe, 1946–1953
Sir Dick White, 1953–1956
Sir Roger Hollis, 1956–1965
Sir Martin Furnival Jones, 1965–1972
Sir Michael Hanley, 1972–1978
Sir Howard Smith, 1978–1981
Sir John Jones, 1981–1985
Sir Antony Duff, 1985–1988
Sir Patrick Walker, 1988–1992
Dame Stella Rimington, 1992–1996
Sir Stephen Lander, 1996–2002
Dame Eliza Manningham-Buller, 2002–2007
Sir Jonathan Evans, 2007–2013
Sir Andrew Parker, 2013–2020
Ken McCallum, from 2020

See also
Chief of the Secret Intelligence Service
Director of the Government Communications Headquarters

References

External links
 List of Directors General on the MI5 website

 
MI5